Samogitian ( or sometimes , žemaitiu šnekta or) is an Eastern Baltic language spoken mostly in Samogitia (in the western part of Lithuania). Although originally regarded as a Lithuanian dialect, Samogitian has since been recognized as a separate language inside and outside of Lithuania, obtaining increasingly more recognition as a distinct language in the recent years. Several attempts have been made to standardize it.

The Samogitian language should not be confused with the interdialect of the Lithuanian language as spoken in the Duchy of Samogitia before Lithuanian became a written language, which later developed into one of the two variants of written Lithuanian used in the Grand Duchy of Lithuania  based on the so-called middle dialect of the Kėdainiai region. This was called the Samogitian (Žemaitian) language; the term "Lithuanian language" then referred to the other variant,  which had been based on the eastern Aukštaitian dialects centred around the capital Vilnius; Samogitian was generally used in the Samogitian Diocese while Lithuanian was generally used in the Vilna Diocese.  This Samogitian language was based on western Aukštaitian dialects and is unrelated to what is today called the Samogitian language – it is instead the direct ancestor of the modern Lithuanian literary language.

History

Samogitian, heavily influenced by Curonian, originated from the East Baltic proto-Samogitian language, which was close to the Aukštaitian dialect of Lithuanian.

During the 5th century, Proto-Samogitians migrated from the lowlands of central Lithuania, near Kaunas, into the Dubysa and Jūra basins, as well as into the Samogitian highlands. They displaced or assimilated the local, Curonian-speaking Balts. Further north, they displaced or assimilated the indigenous, Semigallian-speaking peoples. Assimilation of Curonians and Semigallians gave birth to the three Samogitian dialects: "Dounininkų", "Donininkų" and "Dūnininkų."

In the 13th century, Žemaitija became a part of the Baltic confederation called the Duchy of Lithuania (Lietuva), which was formed by Mindaugas. Lithuania conquered the coast of the Baltic Sea from the Livonian Order. The coast was populated by Curonians, but became a part of the Duchy of Samogitia. From the 13th century onwards, Samogitians settled within the former Curonian lands, and intermarried with that population over the next three hundred years. During the Christianization of Samogitia, none of the clergy, who came to the Duchy of Samogitia with King Władysław II Jagiełło of Poland, were able to communicate with the natives, therefore Jagiełło himself taught the Samogitians about Catholicism, as he was able to communicate in Samogitian. The Curonians had a huge cultural influence upon Samogitian and Lithuanian culture, but they were ultimately assimilated by the 16th century. Its dying language has enormously influenced the dialect, in particular phonetics.

The earliest writings in Samogitian appeared in the 19th century.

Phonology

Samogitian and its dialects preserved many features of the Curonian language, for example:
widening of proto-Baltic short i (i → ė sometimes e)
widening of proto-Baltic short u (u → o)
retraction of ė in northern dialects (i → ė) (pilkas → pėlks)
preservation of West Baltic diphthong ei (Lithuanian ie → Samogitian ėi)
no t' d' palatalization to č dž (Latvian š, ž)
specific lexis, like cīrulis (lark), pīle (duck), leitis (Lithuanian) etc.
retraction of stress
shortening of ending -as to -s like in Latvian and Old Prussian (Proto-Indo-European o-stem)
as well as various other features not listed here.

The earliest writings in the Samogitian language appeared in the 19th century.

Grammar

The Samogitian language is highly inflected like Lithuanian, in which the relationships between parts of speech and their roles in a sentence are expressed by numerous flexions.
There are two grammatical genders in Samogitian – feminine and masculine. Relics of historical neuter are almost fully extinct while in Lithuanian some isolated forms remain. Those forms are replaced by masculine ones in Samogitian. Samogitian stress is mobile but often retracted at the end of words, and is also characterised by pitch accent. Samogitian has a broken tone like the Latvian and Danish languages. The circumflex of Lithuanian is replaced by an acute tone in Samogitian.
It has five noun and three adjective declensions. Noun declensions are different from Lithuanian (see the next section). There are only two verb conjugations. All verbs have present, past, past iterative and future tenses of the indicative mood, subjunctive (or conditional) and imperative moods (both without distinction of tenses) and infinitive. The formation of past iterative is different from Lithuanian. There are three numbers in Samogitian: singular, plural and dual. Dual is almost extinct in Lithuanian. The third person of all three numbers is common.
Samogitian as the Lithuanian has a very rich system of participles, which are derived from all tenses with distinct active and passive forms, and several gerund forms. Nouns and other declinable words are declined in eight cases: nominative, genitive, dative, accusative, instrumental, locative (inessive), vocative and illative.

Literature
The earliest writings in Samogitian dialect appear in the 19th century. Famous authors writing in Samogitian:
  also called Giedraitis (1754–1838) Bishop of Samogitia from 1801, champion of education and patron of Lithuanian literature, published the first translation of the New Testament into język żmudzki (Polish for "Samogitian language") in 1814.  It was subsequently revised a number of times.
  and his heroic poem “Biruta”, first printed in 1829. “Biruta” became a hymn of Lithuanian student emigrants in the 19th century.
 Simonas Stanevičius (Sėmuons Stanevėčios) with his famous book “” (Six fables) printed in 1829.
 Simonas Daukantas (Sėmuons Daukonts in Samogitian), he was the first Lithuanian historian writing in Lithuanian (actually in its dialect). His famous book – “” (Customs of ancient Lithuanian highlanders and Samogitians) was printed in 1854.
 Motiejus Valančius (Muotiejos Valončios or Valontė) and one of his books “” (Joseph of Palanga), printed in 1869.
There are no written grammar books in Samogitian because in Lithuania it is generally considered to be a dialect of Lithuanian, but there were some attempts to standardise its written form.
Today, Samogitian has a standardised writing system but it still remains a spoken language, as nearly everyone writes in their native speech.

Differences from Lithuanian
Samogitian differs from Lithuanian in phonetics, lexicon, syntax and morphology.

Phonetic differences from Lithuanian are varied, and each Samogitian dialect (West, North and South) has different reflections.

Lithuanian ~ Samogitian 

 Short vowels:
 i ~ short ė, sometimes e (in some cases õ);
 u ~ short o (in some cases u);
 Long vowels and diphthongs:
 ė ~ ie;
 o ~ uo;
 ie ~ long ė, ėi, ī (y) (West, North and South);
 uo ~ ō, ou, ū (West, North and South);
 ai ~ ā ;
 ei, iai ~ ē;
 ui ~ oi;
 oi (oj) ~ uo;
 ia ~ ė;
 io ~ ė;
 Nasal diphthongs:
 an ~ on (an in south-east);
 un ~ on (un in south-east);
 ą ~ an in south-eastern, on in the central region, ō / ou in the north;
 unstressed ią ~ ė;
 ę (e) ~ en in south-eastern, ėn in the central region and õ, ō or ėi in the north;
 ū ~ ū (in some cases un, um);
 ų in stressed endings ~ un and um;
 unstressed ų ~ o;
 y ~ ī (y), sometimes in;
 
 i from Proto-Balto-Slavic *ī ~ ī;
 u from PBSl *ō (Lithuanian uo) ~ ō / ou / ū (West / North / South)
 i from PBSl*ei (Lithuanian ie) ~ long ė / ėi / ī (West / North / South)
 Postalveolar consonants
 č ~ t (also č under Lithuanian influence);
 dž ~ d (also dž under Lithuanian influence);

The main difference between Samogitian and Lithuanian is verb conjugation.
The past iterative tense is formed differently from Lithuanian (e.g., in Lithuanian the past iterative tense, meaning that action which was done in the past repeatedly, is made by removing the ending -ti and adding -davo (mirti – mirdavo, pūti – pūdavo), while in Samogitian, the word liuob is added instead before the word). The second verb conjugation is extinct in Samogitian, it merged with the first one. The plural reflexive ending is -muos instead of expected -mies which is in Lithuanian (-mės) and other dialects. Samogitian preserved a lot of relics of athematic conjugation which did not survive in Lithuanian. The intonation in the future tense third person is the same as in the infinitive, in Lithuanian it shifts. The subjunctive conjugation is different from Lithuanian. Dual is preserved perfectly while in Lithuanian it has been completely lost.

The differences between nominals are considerable too.
The fifth noun declension has almost become extinct, it merged with the third one. The plural and some singular cases of the fourth declension have endings of the first one (e.g.: singular nominative , plural nom. , in Lithuanian: sg. nom. , pl. nom. ). The neuter of adjectives is extinct (it was pushed out by adverbs, except  'warm',  'cold',  'hot') while in Lithuanian it is still alive. Neuter pronouns were replaced by masculine. The second declension of adjectives is almost extinct (having merged with the first declension)—only singular nominative case endings survived. The formation of pronominals is also different from Lithuanian.

Other morphological differences
Samogitian also has many words and figures of speech that are altogether different from typically Lithuanian ones, some were borrowed from the neighbouring Latvian language.  e.g.,  'basket' (Lith. , Latvian ),  'thin' (Lith. , Latvian ),  'ribs' (Lith. , Latvian ),  'can't be!' (Lith. ).

Dialects

Samogitian is divided into three major dialects: Northern Samogitian (spoken in Telšiai and Kretinga regions), Western Samogitian (was spoken in the region around Klaipėda, now nearly extinct, – after 1945, many people were expelled and new ones came to this region) and Southern Samogitian (spoken in Varniai, Kelmė, Tauragė and Raseiniai regions). Historically, these are classified by their pronunciation of the Lithuanian word Duona, "bread." They are referred to as Dounininkai (from Douna), Donininkai (from Dona) and Dūnininkai (from Dūna).

Political situation

Samogitian is rapidly declining: it is not used in the local school system and there is only one quarterly magazine and no television broadcasts in Samogitian. There are some radio broadcasts in Samogitian (in Klaipėda and Telšiai). Local newspapers and broadcast stations use Lithuanian instead. There is no new literature in Samogitian either, as authors prefer Lithuanian for its accessibility to a larger audience. Out of those people who speak Samogitian, only a few can understand its written form well.

Migration of Samogitian speakers to other parts of the country and migration into Samogitia have reduced contact between Samogitian speakers, and therefore the level of fluency of those speakers.

There are attempts by the Samogitian Cultural Society to stem the loss of the language. The council of Telšiai city put marks with Samogitian names for the city at the roads leading to the city, while the council of Skuodas claim to use the language during the sessions. A new system for writing Samogitian was created.

Writing system

The first use of a unique writing system for Samogitian was in the interwar period, however it was neglected during the Soviet period, so only elderly people knew how to write in Samogitian at the time Lithuania regained independence. The Samogitian Cultural Society renewed the system to make it more usable.

The writing system uses similar letters similar to the ones in Lithuanian orthography, but with the following differences:

There are no nasal vowels (therefore no need for letters with ogoneks: ą, ę, į, ų).
There are three additional long vowels, written with macrons above (as in Latvian): ā, ē, ō.
Long i in Samogitian is written with a macron above: ī (unlike Lithuanian where it is y).
The long vowel ė is written like ė with macron: Ė̄  and ė̄. Image:E smg.jpg In the pre-Unicode 8-bit computer fonts for Samogitian, the letter 'ė with macron' was mapped on the code of the letter õ. From this circumstance a belief sprang that 'ė with macron' could be substituted with the character õ. It is not so, however. In fact, if the letter 'ė with macron' is for some reason not available, it can be substituted with the doubling of the macron-less letter, that is, 'ėė'.
The letter õ is used to represent a vowel characteristic of Samogitian that does not exist in Lithuanian, the unrounded back vowel . This letter is a rather new innovation which alleviates the confusion that came from having two different sounds both represented by the letter ė. The letter ė could be realised as a close-mid front unrounded vowel  (Žemaitėjė) or as an unrounded back vowel  (Tėn) or (Pėlks) → Tõn, Põlks. This new letter takes over the unrounded back vowel, while ė retains the close-mid front unrounded vowel sound.
There are two additional diphthongs in Samogitian that are written as digraphs: ou and ėi. (The component letters are part of the Lithuanian alphabet.)

As previously it was difficult to add these new characters to typesets, some older Samogitian texts use double letters instead of macrons to indicate long vowels, for example aa for ā and ee for ē;  now the Samogitian Cultural Society discourages these conventions and recommends using the letters with macrons above instead.  The use of double letters is accepted in cases where computer fonts do not have Samogitian letters; in such cases y is used instead of Samogitian ī, the same as in Lithuanian, while other long letters are written as double letters. The apostrophe might be used to denote palatalization in some cases; in others i is used for this, as in Lithuanian.

A Samogitian computer keyboard layout has been created.

Samogitian alphabet:

Samples

See also 

 Samogitian Wikipedia
 Latgalian language

References

External links

 
Samogitia
 Maps of Lithuania with Samogitian Dialects' Borders
 Samogitian dictionary 

Lithuanian dialects
Articles citing ISO change requests
Dialect